The Minnesota-Wisconsin price (M-W price), prior to May 1995, was a component of the basic formula price for farm milk formerly used in federal milk marketing orders. It represented a survey of the average price Minnesota and Wisconsin plants were paying farmers for Grade B milk to be used in processed dairy products. In 1995, the M-W price was replaced with the basic formula price as the price mover under federal milk marketing orders.

See also 

 Wisconsin dairy industry

References 

Pricing
Dairy farming in the United States
Agriculture in Minnesota
Agriculture in Wisconsin